Percursaria percursa is a species of seaweed from the family Ulvaceae. The species type locality is Denmark.

References

Ulvaceae